Atropos (minor planet designation: 273 Atropos) is a typical Main belt asteroid that was discovered by Austrian astronomer Johann Palisa on 8 March 1888 in Vienna.

Photometric observations of this asteroid at the Palmer Divide Observatory in Colorado Springs, Colorado, in 2007 gave a light curve with a period of 23.852 ± 0.003 hours and a brightness variation of 0.60 ± 0.03 in magnitude.

References

External links 
 Lightcurve plot of 273 Atropos, Palmer Divide Observatory, B. D. Warner (2007)
 Asteroid Lightcurve Database (LCDB), query form (info )
 Dictionary of Minor Planet Names, Google books
 Asteroids and comets rotation curves, CdR – Observatoire de Genève, Raoul Behrend
 Discovery Circumstances: Numbered Minor Planets (1)-(5000) – Minor Planet Center
 
 

Background asteroids
Atropos
Atropos
SCTU-type asteroids (Tholen)
18880308